Donnis Butcher (February 8, 1936 – October 8, 2012) was an American basketball player.  A 6'1" guard from Pikeville College, Butcher was selected by the New York Knicks in the seventh round of the 1961 NBA Draft.

References

External links
 
 BasketballReference.com: Donnie Butcher (as coach)

1936 births
2012 deaths
American men's basketball coaches
American men's basketball players
Basketball coaches from Kentucky
Basketball players from Kentucky
Detroit Pistons head coaches
Detroit Pistons players
Junior college men's basketball players in the United States
New York Knicks draft picks
New York Knicks players
People from Johnson County, Kentucky
Pikeville Bears men's basketball players
Point guards
Shooting guards